Roger Baldwin may refer to:

 Roger Sherman Baldwin, (1793–1863), US lawyer and politician
 Roger Nash Baldwin, (1884–1981), founder of ACLU
 Roger Baldwin, blackjack strategy pioneer
 Roger Baldwin (diver), commercial diver, killed in Waage Drill II accident